V-Drums (Virtual Drums) are a line of electronic drums by Roland Corporation Introduced originally in 1997.

Trigger types 
V-Drums trigger devices are of four major types: mesh-head drum pads, rubber pads, cymbal pads and acoustic drum triggers. Mesh-head pads look very similar to acoustic drums, and attempt to emulate their feel. The simpler, more generic type is a rubber pad, which is less expensive, but also looks and feels less like an acoustic drum. There are several models of cymbal pads (also called V-Cymbals). The more expensive ones attempt to emulate the physical properties of acoustic cymbals of various types (e.g.: hi-hat, crash, ride), while the simpler, less expensive cymbal pads are less realistic. Acoustic drum triggers can be used to provide trigger signals from standard acoustic drums.

From an electrical point of view, trigger pads can be of the following types:
 Mono Pads, using one Piezoelectric sensor for the head. Usually kick-drum pads or older and less expensive pads.
 Stereo Pads, using one piezo sensor for the head and an additional switch for the rim. If the rim switch is triggered, the signal strength is determined by the head's piezo sensor. Mostly rubber pads and cymbal pads.
 Stereo Pads using two piezo sensors, one for the head and one for the rim. Mostly mesh-head pads.
 Three-way Pads using one piezo sensor and two switches. Roland's three-way cymbal pads (CY-12R/C, CY-13R and CY-15R) work this way, the piezo triggers the bow, and the switches trigger edge and bell.

Rubber pads
Round rubber pads were introduced with the TD-7 drum module in 1992 (previous Roland pads were polygonal) and were universally used as trigger pads for drums and cymbals. Since the introduction of mesh-head drum pads and cymbal-shaped trigger pads, standard rubber pads are only used as tom-tom and (until recently) bass drum trigger pads on Roland's less expensive drum kits. More expensive kits don't include any rubber pads at all any more.

The downsides of rubber pads are their less realistic rebound and their relatively high ambient noise level (compared to mesh-head pads), but their lower price, and increased durability, still makes them a better choice in some cases.

Cloth-head pads
Cloth-head drum pads were introduced with the KD-9 in 2011, using a cloth-like material as the drum head with an underlying, relatively thick layer of foam. These pads are softer than rubber pads and feel more realistic, while producing less ambient noise. They are only available in small sizes though, and the head tension cannot be adjusted like on mesh-head pads.

Mesh-head pads
Roland V-Drums mesh-head triggers resemble acoustic drums in both appearance and feel. The striking surface is a two-layer taut woven mesh of fibers fitted with several electronic sensors. This allows the mesh-head trigger to respond to the play of a drumstick in a manner that feels more like real drums than their earlier rubber predecessors. Roland developers have stated that the design of the mesh-head V-Pad was inspired in part by a small toy trampoline.

In 1997, Roland developed and patented an updated version of mesh-head drum triggers, a key feature of the V-Drums line. As such, the name "V-Drums" sometimes refers specifically to Roland's mesh-head based drum triggers. The company began marketing the mesh-head triggers under the "V-Drums" name in 1997, in conjunction with the TD-10 drum module.

Most Roland mesh-head V-Drums have a playable rim which have their own electronic sensors (and corresponding sounds) - exceptions being the PD-100, PD-80, and mesh head drums on the HD series of kits, which only have a single head sensor. V-Drums and other electronic drum products have taken substantial market share from acoustic drums due to advances in electronic drum technology that have improved the value proposition of electronic drums over acoustic. Electronic drum kits, especially mesh-head based ones, make significantly less ambient noise than acoustic drum kits and mesh heads provide a playing feel more similar to acoustic drums than non-mesh electronic pads (typically rubber).

Mesh heads used in V-Drums kits today are made by the American drumhead company Remo.

Acoustic drum triggers
Roland also makes acoustic drum triggers, which can be mounted on the rims of standard acoustic drums and provide a trigger signal from those drums, effectively turning them into trigger pads. The acoustic drumhead can either be left on the drum, to get the acoustic sound as well as a trigger signal, or the drumhead can be replaced with a mesh-head to lower ambient noise, if only the trigger signal is needed.

Cymbal pads
In the early 2000s, Roland moved away from using standard rubber pads as cymbal triggers and introduced new cymbal-shaped trigger pads with a rubber surface, which they call V-Cymbals.

The more expensive cymbal pads can swing freely after being hit (only rotation of the pad is prevented by a special cymbal mount), so they feel more like real cymbals, while the less expensive cymbal pads are not movable and always stay in their fixed position, thus feeling less realistic. Some of the movable pads also feature a third bell zone, which is triggered when hitting the bell area of the cymbal pad. These cymbal pads are called three-way cymbals because of their three trigger zones (bell, bow and edge).

Electronic hi-hats
Electronic hi-hats are always made up of two components: a trigger pad to detect hits, and a variable resistor-based hi-hat controller to detect the foot position, so the drum module can determine whether the hi-hat is supposed to be open or closed (or somewhere in between).

The simpler, less expensive solution uses a simple fixed V-Cymbal pad in combination with a separate foot pedal controller, which allows the drum module to replicate the sound of a hi-hat, but does not emulate the feel and scope of expressiveness of acoustic hi-hats.

The more expensive V-Hi-Hats integrate trigger pad and controller into a set of two opposing pieces, designed to be mounted on a conventional hi-hat stand. Because the hi-hat pad moves with the position of the pedal and can swing freely when the hi-hat is opened, this solution is more similar to a traditional acoustic hi-hat. The most complex and most expensive VH-13 V-Hi-Hat and the older VH-12 can also detect different amounts of foot pressure in the closed position, but they are only compatible with the TD-30 and the older TD-12 and TD-20 drum modules. The simpler VH-11 can be used with more modules, but it cannot sense foot pressure in the closed position.

Roland drum modules 

Roland drum modules range in features and price from the top-of-the-line TD-50X to the TD-50, TD-27, TD-17, TD-07, and TD-1. Higher model numbers denote more advanced models, while lower numbers are used for less expensive ones.

Available drum modules

Availability Timeline

References

External links
 Roland V-Drums Official Portal

Drums
Electronic musical instruments